Megasoma occidentale is a species of scarab beetle. It is endemic to Mexico and is known from the Oaxaca and Sinaloa states. Adults are attracted by light. Larvae have been collected in rotten coconut palm stems.

References 

Dynastinae
Beetles described in 1963
Beetles of North America
Endemic insects of Mexico